Omega Delta Sigma National Veterans Fraternity, also known as ODS, is a leadership and service based co-ed fraternity.

History
Omega Delta Sigma was founded at the University of Florida in 1999 as a way for veterans to come together, share experiences, and meet other veterans. The founders were:

 Carlos Espitia (USMC) serving as University of Florida Chapter President, National Chapter President
 Dave Morton (USN), serving as Santa Fe / Saint Leo University Chapters President, National Chapter Vice President
 Scott Raeburn (USMC)
 Jason Cottey (USAF)
 John Travis Rivero (US Army), K.I.A. 2002

Since its founding, Omega Delta Sigma has established a number of other chapters located across the United States.

Purpose 
 has three goals:

 To facilitate the transition from military life to collegiate life and to provide a network of contacts
 Provide support within the fraternity
 Offer services to veterans

Leadership 

National Presidents
2000–2009 Carlos Espitia
2009–2012 Peter Ficnerski
2012–2016 Sam Smith
2016–Present Vincent Rivera

Philanthropy 
Omega Delta Sigma donates to Wounded Warrior Project, Support The Troops, and Toys for Tots. In addition, each chapter organizes their own philanthropy events.

Chapters established 
 National Headquarters: National Chapter: 2009
 Florida Alpha: University of Florida: 1999
 Florida Beta: Saint Leo University: 1999
 Texas Alpha: Texas A&M-Kingsville: 2009
 Pennsylvania Alpha: Pennsylvania State University University Park: 2010 
 Nevada Alpha: University of Nevada Reno: 2011 
 California Alpha: California State University Fresno: 2011
 Massachusetts Alpha: University of Massachusetts Amherst: 2012
 Ohio Beta: University of Cincinnati: 2012
 Pennsylvania Beta: Pennsylvania State University Altoona: 2013
 Pennsylvania Gamma: Pennsylvania State University Lehigh Valley: 2014
 New Jersey Alpha: William Paterson University: 2015
 Illinois Alpha: Illinois State University: 2015
 Pennsylvania Delta: Pennsylvania College of Technology: 2015 
 Louisiana Alpha: University of New Orleans: March 14, 2018

See also 
Other veteran organizations:
Kappa Epsilon Psi Military Sorority, Inc. – International Veterans Sorority
Alpha Gamma Xi Military Sorority, Inc. – International Veterans Sorority
Sigma Alpha Gamma Military Fraternity, Inc. – International Veterans Fraternity

References

External links
 

Student societies in the United States
2001 establishments in Florida
Student organizations established in 2001